The Hyundai i20 R5 is a rally car built by Hyundai Motorsport and based upon the Hyundai i20 road car. It is built to R5 regulations. The i20 R5 made its competitive début at the 2016 Tour de Corse, where it was driven by Kevin Abbring and Sebastian Marshall. The car currently competes in the World Rally Championship-2 and the European Rally Championship where it is entered by Hyundai's factory team and various privateers. Its successor, the Hyundai i20 N Rally2, is due to be introduced in 2021.

Results

World Rally Championship-2 victories

World Rally Championship-3 victories

See also
 Hyundai i20 Coupe WRC
 Group R
 Citroën C3 R5
 Ford Fiesta R5
 Škoda Fabia R5
 Volkswagen Polo GTI R5

References

R5 cars
R5
All-wheel-drive vehicles